This is a list of terrestrial fibre optic cable projects in Africa. While submarine communications cables are used to connect countries and continents to the Internet, terrestrial fibre optic cables are used to extend this connectivity to landlocked countries or to urban centers within a country that has submarine cable access. In most of the world, a large number of such cables exist, often amounting to robust Internet backbones. The lack of such high-speed cables poses a great problem for most African countries. The construction of both submarine cables and their terrestrial extensions is thus considered an important step to economic growth and development to many African countries.

Countries

Algeria

Angola

Benin

Botswana

Burkina Faso

Burundi

Cameroon

Chad

Cote d'Ivoire

Democratic Republic of Congo

Djibouti

Egypt

eSwatini

Ethiopia

Gambia

Ghana

Guinea

Kenya

Liberia

Madagascar

Malawi

Mali

Mauritania

Morocco

Mozambique

Namibia

Niger

Nigeria

Rwanda

Senegal

Somalia

South Africa

South Sudan

Sudan

Tanzania

Togo

Uganda

Zambia

Zimbabwe

Notes 
This list was initially developed as part of AfTerFibre, a project to map terrestrial fibre optic cable projects in Africa. The project was sponsored by Google Africa and, on completion, will be hosted by the UbuntuNet Alliance. All information gathered by the project will be publicly available under an open license.

See also 
 List of international submarine communications cables
 Central African Backbone
 Kenya Data Networks
 Telecommunications in Namibia
 Internet in Ethiopia
 People's Republic of China – Ghana relations

References

External links 
 AfTerFibre Google Group
 AfTerFibre Map
 Greg's Cable Map
 African Undersea Cables

 
Optical telecommunications cables